The 2012 Durango-Durango Emakumeen Saria was the eleventh running of the Durango-Durango Emakumeen Saria, a women's bicycle race in Spain. It was rated by the UCI as a 1.2 category race.

Results

source

References

External links
 Official website 

2012 in Spanish road cycling
Durango-Durango Emakumeen Saria
June 2012 sports events in Europe